Servais is a given name of French origin, being the French version of the Latin name Servatius. See, for example:
 Servais de Condé, a servant of Mary, Queen of Scots
 Servais Le Roy (1865-1953), a Belgian magician, illusion designer and businessman
 Servais Knaven (born 1971), a Dutch professional road bicycle racer
 Servais-Théodore Pinckaers (1925-2008), a Belgian Dominican moral theologian and Catholic priest

French masculine given names